Kauwhata is a rural locality and a statistical area in Manawatu District, in the Manawatū-Whanganui region in New Zealand's central North Island.

The locality is named after a Māori chief who originally owned the land.

Kauwhata School existed at least between 1913 and 1928.

Demographics

There were 666 households. There were 1,002 males and 969 females, giving a sex ratio of 1.03 males per female. The median age was 41.6 years (compared with 37.4 years nationally), with 414 people (21.0%) aged under 15 years, 318 (16.1%) aged 15 to 29, 966 (49.0%) aged 30 to 64, and 276 (14.0%) aged 65 or older.

Ethnicities were 91.0% European/Pākehā, 12.6% Māori, 1.2% Pacific peoples, 2.4% Asian, and 2.4% other ethnicities (totals add to more than 100% since people could identify with multiple ethnicities).

The proportion of people born overseas was 8.7%, compared with 27.1% nationally.

Although some people objected to giving their religion, 50.2% had no religion, 39.6% were Christian, 0.3% were Hindu, 0.2% were Buddhist and 1.2% had other religions.

Of those at least 15 years old, 279 (17.9%) people had a bachelor or higher degree, and 297 (19.1%) people had no formal qualifications. The median income was $39,000, compared with $31,800 nationally. The employment status of those at least 15 was that 897 (57.6%) people were employed full-time, 255 (16.4%) were part-time, and 42 (2.7%) were unemployed.

References

Populated places in Manawatū-Whanganui
Manawatu District